Trichromia supracoccinea is a species of moth from in the family Erebidae. The species was first described by Benoît Vincent and Michel Laguerre in 2017.

Description 
Trichromia supracoccinea is a 20 tot 30 mm long moth, which is endemic to French Guiana.

Range 
The species has recently been described. Observations are sparse. The holotype and paratype were collected in French Guiana.

References

    

Fauna of French Guiana
supracoccinea